Nilkantha Upreti is a former Chief Election Commissioner of Election Commission of Nepal. 
 He had retired by late 2015.

References

Living people
People from Chitwan District
Year of birth missing (living people)